Tyler John Buchan (born 12 September 1985) is a Scottish former cricketer.

Buchan was born at Aberdeen in September 1985. He was selected in the Scotland Under-19 squad for the 2006 ICC Under-19 Cricket World Cup, making three appearances during the tournament. He later played for the senior Scotland side during their tour of Namibia in October 2011, making five Twenty20 appearances against the Namibian cricket team. He took two wickets during the series. In club cricket, Buchan played for Aberdeenshire Cricket Club.

References

External links
 

1985 births
Living people
Cricketers from Aberdeen
Scottish cricketers